118 South African Infantry Battalion was a motorised infantry unit of the South African Army.

History

Origin of the black battalions
By the late 1970s the South African government had abandoned its opposition to arming black soldiers within the SADF.

By early 1979, the government approved a plan to form a number of regional African battalions, each with a particular ethnic identity, which would serve in their homeland or under regional SADF commands.

Development of the Lebowa Defence Force
Two additional Northern Sotho Battalions were established, the 117 and the 118. Troops for 118 SA Battalion were recruited from the self-governing territory of Lebowa.

Higher Command
118 Battalion initially resorted under the command of Group 45 then Group 14 from Potgietersrus. This command was eventually changed to Group 29 with amalgamation.

Deployments
118 Battalion was utilised to patrol the Lebowa and parts of the Botswana border. At some stage the unit was also stationed at Mtubatuba in Kwa Zulu Natal for border patrols in that region.

Disbandment
2006.

Insignia

Notes

References

Infantry battalions of South Africa
Military units and formations of South Africa in the Border War